The Zacapu Lagoon is a small perennial wetland located within the urban area of Zacapu, Michoacán, Mexico. It has an approximate area of 33 hectares, connects with the Lerma River through the Angulo River and is fed by 20 springs. The Zacapu Lagoon was included within the Ramsar wetlands in June 2004.

Zacapu Lagoon is the only known habitat for the Zacapu shiner, Zacapu allotoca, Zacapu dwarf crayfish and Anderson's salamander.

References 

Protected areas of Michoacán
Geography of Michoacán
Lagoons of Mexico
Ramsar sites in Mexico
Lerma River